
The following lists events that happened during 1843 in South Africa.

Events

 23 April - Hendrik Cloete is appointed Commissioner of Natal
 4 May - Natal is proclaimed a British colony
 8 August - The Volksraad of Natal agrees to the terms of British annexation as a Crown Colony, resulting in a Trek of Boers to territories outside Natal

References
See Years in South Africa for list of References

 
South Africa
Years in South Africa